SimPark is a 1996 video game by Maxis. The object of the game is to cultivate and manage a successful park. Similar to SimTown, it is targeted more towards children than the average player. SimPark attempts to show the importance of ecological balance. It could well be considered a 'lite' version of SimIsle.

Overview
SimPark was a simple game designed for a younger audience. It is not possible to lose the game by getting fired or running out of money.

Gameplay 

Players have to quickly learn how doing (or not doing) various things will affect how their park grows. For instance, if certain flower types are not planted, the park will not attract bees. If the bees are not flying around the park, then pollination will not occur, which is an important aspect of keeping the park growing. On top of properly managing the plant and animal population, players are also required to identify the park's plants and animals.

Players often receive in-game email, such as their boss telling them to make the park more diverse, or their virtual mother telling about life back at home (e.g.: "I baked you a cake..." etc.) Occasionally, the Boss's pet frog Rizzo will make an appearance on the screen to give the player advice, or nag about the way they are handling things.

The park can experience disasters, including:
 Garbage Dump: The Garbage Dump is just a big pile of rubbish. As soon as it is made, rats start to emerge from it and inhabit your park. The only ways to get rid of the garbage dump are to put water on it or to place many garbage-eating animals, such as rats and black bears, around the garbage dump.
 Fire
 Kudzu: Kudzu plants begin to overgrown the park.
 Alien invasion: The Alien Invasion consists of flat, pink-and-blue creatures that litter the park grounds and sometimes float on the water. If the map is clicked to get a zoomed-out map view, the pattern the Aliens form may be in the shape of letters. One example of this is a message which reads: "Surrender, Dorothy". This is a parody of the movie The Wizard of Oz. The only way to get rid of aliens, aside from using cheat codes, is to bulldoze them with the "Bulldozer" tool.

The option of using a microphone feature allows you to click on park-goers and listen to what they have to say. Some of the more memorable quotes include, "My socks don't match," "I didn't brush my teeth this morning," "Eddie! Oh Eddie! Where are you?" and "My favourite book is Wind in the Willows."

It takes about four minutes of real time for a year of time to elapse in the game. The game shows the seasons with the changing color of the leaves.

References

External links

1996 video games
Maxis Sim games
Children's educational video games
Environmental education video games
Business simulation games
Classic Mac OS games
Life simulation games
Strategy video games
Windows games
Video games about plants
Video games developed in the United States
Video games with isometric graphics
Video games scored by Jerry Martin
Video games set in North America